This is a list of highly notable practitioners of Kyokushin Karate.

Founder
 , more commonly known as Mas Oyama, was a karate master who founded Kyokushin Karate.

Oyama's direct students

Japanese nationals

 Terutomo Yamazaki – the first champion of the All-Japan Full Contact Karate Open Championships in 1969, and has promoted Kyokushin famous through his accomplishments. Because he fought and defeated Muay Thai boxers, he created a reputation for Kyokushin before the First All-Japan Open Full Contact Karate Championships was held. Yamazaki is highly skilled at and an authority on fighting and breaking. When he fought someone, it was usual that he knocked them out without receiving any injuries himself. He is nicknamed "The Genius Karate Fighter" or "The Dragon of Kyokushin", and when he was an active fighter, he was the most popular figure of the time. He has shown off his mixed karate and Muai Thai style of fighting at both full contact karate open championships and kickboxing, and has been noted internationally as a prominent fighter in karate's history, appearing in Black Belt Magazine in the United States.
 Yoshiji Soeno, founder of Shidōkan Karate. 
 Hatsuo Royama – 9th dan, Kancho (Director) of the Kyokushin-kan International Honbu.
 Kenji Kurosaki – He is a 7th Dan Black Belt in Kyokushin Karate and operates various martial schools focusing in different arts. He is most well known as a pioneer of Full-Contact Karate and Kickboxing in both Japan and Netherlands.
 Hideyuki Ashihara – founder of Ashihara Karate
 Tsuyoshi Hiroshige – founder of Kyokushin Kenbukai
 Takashi Azuma – founder of the martial art Kūdō.
 Akira Masuda – 8th dan, Rijichō (chairman) of the International BudoMan Association (IBMA-KyokushinKai)
 Moon Jang-gyu (alias  Matsui Akiyoshi) – 8th dan and current Kancho (Director) of the International Karate Organization Kyokushin-kaikan aka IKO-1.
 Katsuaki Satō – winner of the 1st World Full Contact Karate Open Championships and All-Japan Championships on two occasions
 Kenji Midori – winner of the 5th World Full Contact Karate Open Championships and current president of World Karate Organization (Shinkyokushinkai)

Japanese relocated overseas
 Shigeru Oyama – No relation of Mas Oyama, he was a karate practitioner and instructor who operated a dojo in New York for half a century.  He taught Kyokushin karate for many years before forming his own organization World Oyama Karate in 1985.
 Tadashi Nakamura – founder of World Seidō Karate Organization (Seidō-juku). Based out at New York City.
 Jōkō Ninomiya – founder of Enshin Karate, he presides over the Enshin organization from the headquarters (honbu) in Denver, Colorado.
 Seiji Isobe –  8th dan, designated to Brazil, became Shihan after spread Kyokushin through South America, who taught and trained Francisco Filho, Glaube Feitosa and Everton Teixeira.
 Miyuki Miura – 8th dan, operates independently as Miura Dojo in Oak Park, Illinois, and works with other full contact dojo internationally through his Global Budo Karate Alliance.

Non-Japanese expatriates
 Jon Bluming – 10th dan and founder of the Kyokushin Budokai and IBK. In 1965, Bluming became the first non-Japanese in being awarded the 6º dan in karate from Masutatsu Oyama.
 Steve Arneil – 10th dan and founder of the International Federation of Karate (Kyokushin). He was the 1st person after Mas Oyama to successfully complete the 100-man Kumite. 
 Howard Collins – in 1971 began training at the Kyokushin honbu dojo (headquarters training hall) under Oyama.
 Loek Hollander 10th dan.
 Bobby Lowe, 8th dan who served as branch chief of Hawaii for many years. He was the first uchi deshi (live-in student) of Masutatsu Oyama, and was also the first to establish a Kyokushin school outside Japan. 
 Nicholas Pettas – Last Uchi Deshi. 
 Peter Urban – Founder of USA Goju Karate; also a student of Gogen Yamaguchi.
 Peter Chong PBM (alias Peter Chong Seh Jam) – 9th dan and a former Assistant Superintendent of Police in Singapore. In 1965, Chong sailed to Japan to train in Kyokushin karate under Mas Oyama, without informing either his wife or his father of his intentions. He attained the 4th dan in 1972.

Celebrity
 Sir Sean Connery – was awarded an honorary Shodan in Kyokushinkai by Sosai Mas Oyama.
 Masashi "Milton" Ishibashi – worked as a Karate instructor at the Oyama Dojo and Kyokushin Kaikan during his early days as an actor. He was also instructor for Sonny Chiba and Terutomo Yamazaki.
 Sonny Chiba –  popular Japanese actor and martial artist. While he was a university student, he began studying martial arts with Sosei Oyama (whom he later portrayed in a trilogy of films), which led to a first-degree black belt on 15 October 1965, later receiving a fourth-degree on 20 January 1984. Although supervised by Oyama, Chiba was mainly trained by Masashi Ishibashi.
 Etsuko Shihomi – actress who specialized in action films
 Kyosuke Machida – Japanese actor. When he was a child, he became Mas Oyama's pupil. He now serves as a advisor for the International Karate Organization Kyokushin-kaikan.

Knockdown Karate

 Kazuyoshi Ishii – founder of Seidokaikan karate, as well as the K-1 fighting circuit. Began training in Kyokushin karate under Hideyuki Ashihara.
 Hajime Kazumi – a karate fighter who played an active part in the full-contact karate tournaments hosted by Kyokushinkaikan from the early 1990s to the early 2000s. Is recognized as one of Kyokushin Karate's most successful full-contact fighters.
  – is a Chechnyan-Russian karateka. He is a multiple Kyokushin European Champion and Japanese Champion.
 Willie Williams – Nicknamed the "Bear Killer", Williams is an American karateka, mixed martial artist and professional wrestler. 
 Garry O'Neill – Australian karateka and kickboxer, O'Neill is one of the most prolific Kyokushin contestants of his country.
 Tomasz Kucharzewski
 Alejandro Navarro - Spanish Full-contact Karateka. He is a 14-time Kyokushin European Champion, of which Navarro has won the Open Championship eight times.
 Arthur Hovhannisyan
 Samson Muripo
 Jan Kallenbach – was a Dutch martial artist. He was a 7th Dan teacher of Taikiken, a Japanese off-shoot of Yiquan and had a significant history in Full contact Karate (Kyokushin-Kaikan). Veteran Kyokushin practitioners from Japan considered Kallenbach as one of the most dominant foreign fighters during the style's early stages in 1960s and 1970s.
 Daniel "Tiger" Schulmann – American Kyokushin karateka and mixed martial arts trainer. Schulmann was the North American Mas Oyama Full-Contact Karate Champion for six consecutive years (1979–1984)

Kickboxing 
 Andy Hug – regarded as one of the best Kyokushin fighters of all time. He began started practising Kyokushinkai karate from age 10 under Werner Schenker. At age 15, he won the 1979 Swiss Oyama Cup, a national Kyokushin competition. Competed in Kyokushin under Knockdown rules from 1977 to 1991. In 1992, he began pursuing Kickboxing, starting from Seidokaikan and later transitioned to fighting under K-1 Rules.
 Jérôme Le Banner
 Francisco Filho – 7th dan black belt in Kyokushin Karate. Started Kyokushin kaikan around age of 10 and received black belt six and half years later. In 1995 Fancisco Filho completed 100-man kumite in Brazil and in Japan.
 Glaube Feitosa - Brazilian former kickboxer and a kyokushin full contact karate practitioner who was competing in K-1.
 Ewerton Teixeira –  Brazilian professional kickboxer, mixed martial artist, and Kyokushin Kaikan karateka.
 Jan Plas –  was a Dutch professional kickboxer, trainer and founder of the Mejiro Gym in Amsterdam. Started learning Kyokushin from Jon Bluming. He founded the Mejiro Gym in 1978 after learning kickboxing from Kenji Kurosaki.
 Thom Harinck – Dutch kickboxing trainer and founder of the Chakuriki Gym in Amsterdam. At the age of seventeen he worked as a bouncer at a local Club and began a partnership with Jan Stapper, a Kyokushin instructor. 
 Lucien Carbin – Surinamese-Dutch former kickboxer, karateka and trainer. He was the first European Kyokushin karate champion, a world kickboxing champion and a European Savate and Muay Thai champion. Studied Kyokushin under Jon Bluming. 
 Sam Greco –  Australian retired full contact karateka, heavyweight K-1 kickboxer, mixed martial artist. Greco started training in Kyokushin karate at the age of 11 and commenced tournament fighting at the age of 18 establishing himself as one of Australia's best Kyokushin fighters in the late 1980s and early 1990s.
 Semmy Schilt
 Peter Smit
 Michael Thompson (karateka)
 Jan Soukup
 Nicholas Pettas
 Marek Piotrowski
 Peter Graham
 Tenshin Nasukawa
 Masahiro Yamamoto 
 Takayuki Kohiruimaki
 Tsogto Amara
 Leona Pettas
 Baboo Da Silva
 Hiroki Akimoto
 Mike Bernardo
 Aleksandr Pitchkounov
 Yūji Nashiro
 Kengo Shimizu
 Shota Takiya
 Yuki Yoza

Mixed Martial Arts 

 Georges St-Pierre – UFC Hall of Famer (Modern-Era Wing, Class of 2020). He began learning Kyokushin Karate at age seven to defend himself against a school bully.
 Bas Rutten – UFC Hall of Famer (Pioneer wing, 2015 inductee) and three-time King of Pancrase Openweight Champion. After earning a 2nd Dan Black in Taekwondo, Rutten began learning Kyokushin karate and earned a 2nd-degree black belt.
 Ryo Chonan
 Nikita Krylov - Ukrainian mixed martial artist who competes in the light heavyweight division of the Ultimate Fighting Championship. He has Master of Sports in Kyokushin.
 Mariusz Pudzianowski – Held a fourth kyu green belt in Kyokushin in 2009.
 Gerard Gordeau – 9th Dan, currently the head of "Internationale Budo Kai" martial arts organization. Most well-known for his fight against Teila Tuli in the first televised Ultimate Fighting Championship bout on 12 November 1993.
 Manny Gamburyan – Armenian mixed martial artist who has competed in the UFC's lightweight, featherweight, and bantamweight divisions. He began training in Kyokushin Karate at age of 15.
 Uriah Hall
 Mamed Khalidov
 Jan Soukup
 Katsunori Kikuno 
 Andrews Nakahara
 Marius Zaromskis

Celebrity
This lists celebrities, who were not directly trained by Mas Oyama:
 Dolph Lundgren – He took up Kyokushin karate at the age of 10. He captained the Swedish Kyokushin karate team, and was a formidable challenger at the 1979 World Open Tournament (arranged by the Kyokushin Karate Organization) when he was only a green belt. He won the European championships in 1980 and 1981, and a heavyweight tournament in Australia in 1982.
 Batu Khasikov
 Michael Rooker
 Michael Jai White
 Seth Rogen
 Glen Murphy
 Hiroyuki Sanada
 Francesco Bellissimo
 Isaac Florentine
 Maryse Mizanin (née Ouellet) - holds a black belt in Kyokushin Karate.
 Vladimir Putin
 Minoru Fujita
 Mackenyu Arata
 Gordon Maeda
 Hennie Bosman
 William Vanderpuye – British actor, broadcaster, writer, voice-over artist and producer. Currently holds a 3rd Dan black belt in Kyokushin Karate.
 Zulkifli Hasan – an Indonesian politician and businessman. He served as chairman of the Board of Supervisors of Kyokushinkan International Indonesia. In June 2010, he received an honorary black belt from the supreme leader of Kyokushin International.

See also
 List of Karateka

References

Kyokushin kaikan
Kyokushin kaikan practitioners
Lists of martial artists